The Gores Group is a private equity firm specializing in acquiring and partnering with mature and growing businesses. The company was founded in 1987 by its CEO and chairman, Alec E. Gores.

Headquartered in Los Angeles, California, with an office in Boulder, Colorado, and is investing from Gores Capital Partners III, L.P. and Gores Small Capitalization Partners, L.P., which have approximately $1.5 billion and $300 million in capital commitments, respectively. Since 1987, Gores has successfully acquired and operated more than 80 companies.

The company's portfolio as of 2021, includes technology, telecommunications, business services, industrial, media and entertainment and consumer products companies.

History 
In 1978, Alec Gores founded Executive Business Systems, a hardware and software distributor, which he sold eight years later to establish what has become the Gores Group today.

Gores closed its first institutional private equity fund, Gores Capital Partners, L.P., in November 2003 with $400 million of committed capital. The firm's second fund, Gores Capital Partners II, L.P. held a final closing in June 2007 with $1.3 billion of committed capital.

Timeline

1978
 Alec Gores launches his own computer company, Executive Business System (EBS), with $10,000; eight years later, he sells EBS for approximately $2 million current.

1987
 The Gores Group is founded by Alec Gores with the single vision to buy, fix and sell businesses.

1997
 Gores acquires Artemis, a subsidiary of Computer Sciences Corporation (NYSE: CSC).
 Gores completes its purchase of the Connection Machines business unit from Thinking Machines Corporation.

1998
 Gores carves out certain assets of the Computer Integrated Manufacturing (CIM) organization of Texas Instruments (NYSE:TXN); the portfolio company is later named Adventa Control Technologies.

2000
 Gores carves out The Learning Company and Mattel Interactive from Mattel and achieves an operating profit in the first 75 days of ownership.

2001 
 Gores acquires VeriFone from Hewlett Packard Company.

2003
 Netherlands-based Anker BV, an independent European supplier of point of sale technology, was acquired, positioning Gores as an investor in Europe.
 The firm launches Gores Capital Partners, its first private equity fund.

2004
 Gores opens its London office, after several years of investment activity in the U.K. and Europe.

2007
 Gores closed on $1.3 billion in capital for its second institutional fund, Gores Capital Partners II, L.P.

2008
 Gores announced a joint venture with Siemens AG for enterprise communication business.

2010
 Sale of GCP II-owned Vincotech  to Mitsubishi Electric demonstrates Gores’ global reach.

2011
 Gores sells Lineage Power to General Electric in what is the largest sale transaction in Gores’ history.
 Gores closes on $2.1 billion in capital commitments for its third institutional fund, Gores Capital Partners III, L.P.
 Gores acquires an 81.25% majority interest in fashion company Mexx for $85 Million

2012
 Gores Small Capitalization Partners, L.P. sells $300 million in commitments, expanding Gores’ resources for small and lower middle market investments.
 Acquires Harris Broadcast from Harris Corporation in December.

2013
 Stock Building Supply goes public, marking Gores' first U.S. IPO.

2014
 Gores announces plans to close 34 subsidiaries of 45 in total located in Germany and being part of Unify. Close downs are expected to be completed by Q2/2015.
 Gores acquired a 51% stake in Hovis Bread
 Gores sold Norment to Cornerstone, a full service detention equipment contractor based in Alabama
 Gores sells Sage Automotive Interiors to Clearlake Capital
 Gores sells Scovill Fasteners to Morito Co., Ltd., a leading global supplier of apparel fasteners

Recognition 
 On September 26, 2013, Cosmo Specialty Fibers was awarded the Chain-of-custody certification by the Programme for the Endorsement of Forest Certification. This certification recognizes Cosmo Specialty Fibers for using wood fiber sourced through sustainable forestry practices.
 On May 27, 2013, Ford Motor Company announced that it is working with Gores’ Portfolio Company, Sage Automotive Interiors, to accelerate the development of recycled fabrics. Sage is Ford’s largest fabric supplier in North America, and provides Ford with fabric made from industrial waste and clear plastic water bottles. The 2013 Ford Fusion is the first vehicle sold around the world to use recycled fabrics.

Representative transactions 
 January 27, 2014: The Gores Group announced that it has reached a conditional agreement with Premier Foods to operate its bread business as a stand-alone venture under the name of Hovis Limited in order to increase operational efficiencies and grow the Hovis brand.
 August 14, 2013: Stock Building Supply Holdings, Inc. (Nasdaq:STCK) announced that it has closed its previously announced underwritten initial public offering of 7,000,000 shares of common stock at the price to the public of $14.00 per share. The underwriters exercised in their full option to purchase an additional 1,050,000 shares of common stock from certain selling stockholders, resulting in a total initial public offering size of 8,050,000 shares.
 July 30, 2013: Gores’ portfolio company, The Hay Group, announced that it had entered into an agreement to acquire Metallumform, an integrated manufacturer of forged machined automotive components with two plants in Germany. Terms of the transaction were not disclosed.
 January 2, 2013: The Gores Group announced that it had completed the acquisition of Therakos, Inc. from Ortho-Clinical Diagnostics, Inc.
 December 14, 2012: Charles Bank Capital Partners announced that it acquired United Road Services from The Gores Group for an undisclosed amount. Kathleen McCann, president and CEO, will continue to lead the company.
 October 15, 2012: The Gores Group announced that it extended a binding offer to acquire Therakos, Inc. from Ortho-Clinical Diagnostics, Inc. Therakos is company developing products for extracorporeal photopheresis (ECP) immune modulation therapy. The terms of the transaction were not disclosed.
 August 17, 2011: The Carlyle Group announced that it had completed the acquisition of French-based Sagemcom, a global high-technology group specializing in broadband communications and energy activities, from The Gores Group. Carlyle said in a statement it now owned 70 percent of Sagemcom, while the company's management and employees had the remaining 30 percent. Sagemcom has more than 6,000 employees globally and posted sales of 1.4 billion euros in 2010.
 May 9, 2011: The Gores Group announced that it partnered with management to acquire Sage Automotive Interiors, Inc., a supplier of specialty fabric materials for the automotive industry, a portfolio company of Azalea Capital, LLC.
 January 13, 2011: General Electric Co. agreed to buy Lineage Power Holdings Inc. for $520 million from The Gores Group. Lineage supplies equipment that converts power to direct current from alternating current as well as power-module and data-center systems in the $20 billion micro power source industry.

Portfolio 

Current
 AMI Entertainment Network - Digital jukebox and video systems creator that delivers music, video and advertising content to 30,000+ locations in North America and Europe
 Cosmo Specialty Fibers - Manufacturer of paper and related packaging products, producing paper from dissolving grade wood pulp
 GatesAir - Manufacturer of multi-channel television and radio transmitters designed for over-the-air broadcasting and public safety communications
 Imagine Communications - Developer of advanced broadband video processing equipment
 Melle Dachbaustoffe & SIG Deutsche Dachbaustoffe - Specialty distributor of roofing materials in Germany, maintaining an extensive multi-region branch network with a comprehensive product and service offering and excellent relations with their customers and suppliers. The company was merged with Gallhöfer Dach to form MeGa Dach on December 6, 2016
 TurbineAero - Manufacturer of industrial parts and components, specializing in the design and production of aerospace and hot-section components. also offers maintenance, repair and overhaul services to military, commercial, original equipment manufacturers and aircraft operators
 US Farathane - Manufacturer and supplier of functional black plastic, interior and exterior plastic components intended to innovate and pair with solid value
 Vitac - Provider of closed captioning and subtitling services in the United States. The company's services are offered for both live television shows and prerecorded programs

Select Exited
 Alliance Entertainment
 Alpheus Communications
 BMC Stock Building Supply
 DataBlue
 Elo Touch Solutions
 Hovis Bakery
 Sage Automotive Interiors
 Therakos
 Unify

SPACs 
Beginning in 2015, Gores Holdings was announced, specializing in special-purpose acquisition companies (SPACs). It was credited with starting the SPAC revival with their first SPAC transaction in Hostess Brands. Gores is considered one of the most prolific investors in the SPAC space, having created 13 SPACs, more than any other single investor, and The Gores Group is considered a premier SPAC sponsor.

Gores announced or completed more than seven SPAC transactions representing over $36 billion in transaction value.

 Hostess – consumer, maker of Twinkies. Partnered with Apollo and Dean Metropoulos 
 Verra – technology mobility services business. Instrumental for safety, specializing in red light cameras, school bus safety, and tolling
 PAE – government logistics services business with large government contracts
 Luminar – first high growth, technology company. Leader in the automotive Lidar space. Partnered with founder, Austin Russell
 United Wholesale Mortgage (UWM) – mortgage tech business. Largest SPAC transaction to date
 Matterport – 3D spatial data company revolutionizing the real estate tech space
 Ardagh Metal Packaging (AMP) – metal packaging for consumer products. Largest SPAC spin out of public company. Merger with Gores Holdings V, raising almost $1 billion in gross proceeds
 Sonder – a hospitality company. Merger with Gores Metropoulos II
 Polestar – a global premium EV company. Signed definitive agreement to be publicly listed through combination with Gores Guggenheim, Inc. Resulted in an implied enterprise value of $20 billion
 Footprint – materials science technology company, producing packaging for the food and beverage industry. To be publicly listed on NASDAQ through combination with Gores Holdings VIII, Inc.

Gores launched Gores Holdings VII and Gores Holdings VIII in 2021, and publicly filed for Gores Technology Partners and Gores Technology Partners II, as well as Gores Guggenheim, the latter in partnership with Guggenheim Partners.

References

External links
 

Private equity firms of the United States
Financial services companies established in 1987
Companies based in Los Angeles